New York Metro can refer to:

New York metropolitan area
Metro New York, a free daily newspaper in New York
New York City Subway